PT Naga Swarasakti, commonly known as Nagaswara (stylized as NAGASWARA), is an Indonesian music company and headquartered in Jakarta, Indonesia. It was founded in 1999 by Rahayu Kertawiguna and released dance house music in Indonesia from 2000 - 2003. It later combined dangdut with dance music known as dancedhut.

Notable artists include Kerispatih, Wali, The Dance Company, Delon Thamrin, Saint Loco, Siti Badriah, The Virgin, and others.

History

Early years 
Nagaswara was established in 1999 under the legal name PT Naga Swarasakti by Kertawiguna. When it was first established, Nagaswara only produced karaoke and the dance-house music materials. The label released dance music from 2000 through 2003. In 2003, Nagaswara partnered with multinational labels from Europe and holds the main license of their artists to release in the Indonesian market.

In September 2004, Nagaswara produced and released the compilation album titled Gulalikustik, in collaboration with radio station Mustang 88.0 FM. It introduced the artists Kerispatih, Plus Minus, After, and Gemala. The following year, Nagaswara offered a recording deal to Kerispatih and the band released their debut album Kejujuran Hati.

Subsequent years 
Nagaswara signed Wali, Delon Thamrin, T2, The Dance Company, Hello, Merpati and Zivilia.

Nagaswara focuses in releasing dancedhut materials for artists such as Siti Badriah, Denias Ismail and Fitri Carlina.

On January 31, 2018, Kertawiguna's birthday, Nagaswara partnered with Warner Chappell Music as their sub-publisher—Nagaswara handles the publishing of WCM music in Indonesia.

Nagaswara Music Awards 
The Nagaswara Music Awards (NMA) is an annual music awards ceremony held by Nagaswara to give appreciation for its artists. The first NMA was held on December 6 - 7, 2010 at Istora Gelora Bung Karno. Artists that performed at the ceremony included Wali, Kerispatih, Ruth Sahanaya, Hello, Mahadewi, The Virgin, and Zivilia, with support from Magenta Orchestra group led by Andi Rianto. The first NMA aired by ANTV on December 18, 2010.

The second NMA was held December 1-3, 2011 at the Jakarta Convention Center and aired live on Global TV.

The third NMA was held on December 9, 2012 at the Hong Kong Convention and Exhibition Centre and supported by SmarTone.

References

External links 
 

Companies based in Jakarta
Indonesian companies established in 1999
Indonesian record labels
Music publishing companies
Privately held companies of Indonesia
Record label distributors
Record labels established in 1999